Child Restoration Outreach Football Club or simply CRO FC is a football club in Mbale, Uganda. They play in the top level of Ugandan professional football, the Ugandan Super League. They were relegated in 2008.  Mbale Municipal Stadium is their home stadium, it has a capacity of 10,000.

History

Honors

Team

References

External links
Team profile – The Biggest Football Archive of the World

Football clubs in Uganda
Eastern Region, Uganda
Mbale